Zelli may refer to:

People 
 Abdollah Zelli, Commander of the Imperial Iranian Navy, 1941–1952
 Faramarz Zelli (فرامرز ظلی), born 1940, Iranian footballer
 Joe Zelli (1889–1971), owner of nightclubs in Paris and New York
 Leila Zelli, born 1981, Iranian-Canadian artist

Fictional people 
 Stephan and Marya Zelli
 characters in Quartet (novel, 1928)
 characters in Quartet (film, 1981)
 John Zelli, character in Night Parade (film, 1928)

See also

 Zeli